Kenda Perez (born May 18, 1983) is an American model and television host for the UFC and FOX Sports.  Host of the internationally broadcast Best of Pride Fighting Championships running four seasons and the Best Of WEC on Fox Sports 1 running two seasons. Kenda also hosts a weekly online MMA show “The Ultimate Show” on BleacherReport.com and a weekly SiriusXM radio show on Faction Radio. Formally represented by  Famous Stars and Straps owned by Travis Barker.  Kenda is the wife of top ranked professional mixed martial artist Cub Swanson, currently fighting in the UFC.

Career
Kenda was discovered after entering Maxim magazine's Hometown Hotties competition. She was voted as a top four finalist and appeared in the magazine and website. Kenda has continued to work with Maxim Magazine on promotional events, including an appearance on the TV game show 1 vs. 100 and appearing in the magazine numerous times including the cover of the December 2012 issue.

UFC
In 2009, the UFC produced a new show called "The Best of Pride Fighting Championships."  The program showcases some of the best fights, and fighters from Pride. Perez auditioned, and was hired as the host after impressing producers with her natural ability in front of the camera and behind the microphone. The first episode aired on January 15, 2010 on Spike TV. Season two debuted January 3, 2012 on Fuel TV in the United States. The third season aired on Fox Sports 2.  She now currently hosts "The Best Of WEC" in its second season on Fox Sports 1.

The Ultimate Show (Bleacher Report)
She hosted a weekly online MMA show for BleacherReport.com called “The Ultimate Show” for two years, which debuted on August 4, 2011.

In media

Magazine appearances
Maxim Magazine - Dec 2007 // Oct 2012 // Dec 2012
UFC Magazine - Aug/Sept 2010 // Oct 2011//Aug/Sept 2014 (Australia Edition)
Muscle & Fitness - Jan 2011
944 magazine - June 2011 (O.C. Edition)
Fight! Magazine - Aug 2011
Maxim UK  - Dec 2011 (Online Only)
Fighters Only UK - Issue 84
Inside Fitness - Aug/Sept 2012 (with Arianny Celeste and Brittney Palmer)

Features
CNNSI's Hot Clicks "Lovely Lady of the Day" for August 4, 2010
Bleacher Report's "MMA Hottie of the Week" on February 22, 2011
CNNSI's Hot Clicks Photo Gallery of the Day for April 23, 2012
Appears in UFC Undisputed 3 as a PRIDE ring girl.

Personal
Kenda was born in Laguna Beach California and grew up in old-town Orange while attending Orangewood Adventist Academy. She currently resides in Newport Beach, California. Her father, Ken Perez, holds a black belt in Shitō-ryū. Kenda and Cub Swanson were married June 1, 2018 and have a daughter, Royal Rae Swanson born on August 21, 2017 and identical twin boys, Saint Cub Swanson and King Cub Swanson born September 2, 2018.

References

Living people
American female models
American people of Mexican descent
Mixed martial arts broadcasters
1985 births
People from Laguna Beach, California
21st-century American women